Robi Saarma (born 20 May 2001) is an Estonian professional footballer who currently plays as a forward for Meistriliiga club Paide Linnameeskond and the Estonia national team.

Club career
He played for Nõmme United and was the league's top goal scorer before he joined Paide Linnameeskond in January 2022.

International career
Saarma made his senior international debut for Estonia on 12 January 2023, in a 1–0 victory over Finland in a friendly.

Honours
Nõmme United
Esiliiga B: 2019

Paide Linnameeskond
Estonian Cup: 2021–22

Individual
Esiliiga Top Goalscorer: 2021
Meistriliiga Fans' Player of the Year: 2022

References

External links

2001 births
Living people
Footballers from Tallinn
Estonian footballers
Association football forwards
FC Nõmme United players
Paide Linnameeskond players
Esiliiga B players
Esiliiga players
Meistriliiga players
Estonia youth international footballers
Estonia under-21 international footballers
Estonia international footballers